Sandra Bryant (born 30 September 1945) is a British television actress. She is best known for her roles as Sandra in On the Buses and in Coronation Street as Sandra.

Filmography

Film

Television

References

External links
 

1945 births
Living people
English film actresses
English television actresses
People from Edgware